London Buses route 253 is a Transport for London contracted bus route in London, England. Running between Hackney Central and Euston bus station, it is operated by Arriva London.

History

Route 253 commenced operating on 1 February 1961 between Aldgate bus station and Tottenham Court Road via Bethnal Green, Hackney Central, Clapton Pond, Stamford Hill, Manor House, Finsbury Park and Camden Town as a replacement for trolleybus route 653 with AEC Routemasters.

By 1994 the route, now operated by Leaside Buses, was one of the busiest in London, with a peak vehicle requirement of 50 buses operating at a frequency of one bus every two minutes.

The route now runs between Hackney Central and Euston (via Clapton Pond, Stamford Hill, Manor House, Finsbury Park and Camden Town).  The original route is still served in its entirety by night bus N253, while the section of the original route between Hackney Central and Aldgate bus station is now served by the 254.

In November 2009, route 253 was retained by incumbent operator Arriva London. Upon being re-tendered, the route was retained by Arriva London with a new contract commencing on 6 June 2015.

From October 2016, Arriva London began introducing a fleet of 32 New Routemaster buses to serve on the route.  The rollout of new vehicles was completed in December 2016.

Current route
Route 253 operates via these primary locations:
Hackney Central station 
Hackney Baths
Lower Clapton
Clapton Pond
Clapton station  
Cazenove Road/Rossington Street
Stamford Hill station 
Manor House station 
Finsbury Park station  
Holloway Nag's Head for Emirates Stadium
Caledonian Road
Holloway Prison
Camden Road station 
Camden Town station 
Mornington Crescent station 
Euston station   
Euston bus station

In popular culture

The 2001 Chris T-T album "The 253" is named after the route.

The 2009 Just Jack song "253", from the album All Night Cinema, is named after the route.

References

External links

Timetable

Bus routes in London
Transport in the London Borough of Camden
Transport in the London Borough of Hackney
Transport in the London Borough of Islington